Sir John Cotton (1543? – 1620 or 1621), of Landwade, Cambridgeshire, was an English politician.

Cotton was the eldest son of MP, John Cotton of Landwade, Cambridgeshire, Sheriff of Cambridgeshire and Huntingdonshire in 1549/50. He succeeded his father in 1594 and was knighted between 1597 and 1 October 1601.

He was appointed a Justice of the Peace for Cambridgeshire in 1582, served as Custos Rotulorum of Cambridgeshire from 1600 to 1621 (except for 1617) and custos rotulorum of the Isle of Ely from 1601. He was pricked High Sheriff of Cambridgeshire and Huntingdonshire for 1591–92 and appointed Deputy Lieutenant of Cambridgeshire in 1596.

He was elected a Member of Parliament (MP) in the Parliament of England for Cambridgeshire in 1593 and 1601.

He married three times: firstly Elizabeth, the daughter of Thomas Caryll of Warnham, Sussex, secondly Elizabeth, the daughter of Sir Humphrey Bradbourne of Derbyshire and thirdly Anne, the daughter of Sir Richard Hoghton, 1st Baronet of Hoghton Tower and the granddaughter of Sir Richard Houghton, Steward of Amounderness (b. 28 April 1496/98) who bore him James, John and Katherine; only their son John Cotton survived them.

References

 

1543 births
1621 deaths
People from South Cambridgeshire District
English MPs 1593
English MPs 1601
High Sheriffs of Cambridgeshire and Huntingdonshire
People from Forest Heath (district)